Naura is a town in the Shahid Bhagat Singh Nagar district of Punjab, India. It is located about 2 km from Khatkar Kalan, the home town of Shaheed Bhagat Singh, on the Banga - Gharshanker road. Jawaharlal Nehru, first Prime Minister of India visited Naura attending agricultural trade show along with his daughter Indira Gandhi. The town is nicknamed across many Punjabi villages as: "Naura Bhaura".

Population
The town's 2001 population was 3,331. Many of the town's residents and families are settled in other parts of India and overseas, but they still  maintain their ancestral homes in the town.

Education
Naura is home to a branch of the District Institute of Education and Training where primary school teachers are educated and trained.

The town has access to multiple colleges in the nearby cities of Banga, Nawanshahr, Gharshankar and Phagwara.

Notable people
 Ch. Mehboob Ali Khan (1912–1947), Zaildar of Naura and Assessor in session court of Jalandhar
 Sant Baba Sewa Singh ji (qila Anandgarh sahib wale) – Birthplace.

Facilities
Naura is home to a variety of shops (including Bubbi's shop, which sells confectionery, shoes and provides a printing service and Armaan karyana store which provides confectionery products and dairy products) and has 8 Gurdwaras.

Footnotes

Cities and towns in Shaheed Bhagat Singh Nagar district